The Bristol 40 is an American sailboat that was designed by Ted Hood as a racer-cruiser and first built in 1970.

Production
The Bristol 39 was produced 1966-1970 and was replaced in production by the Bristol 40, which was built from  1970-1986. Both are related designs, from the same hull molds. They have same the same principle dimensions, but have different lengths overall.

The Bristol 40 was built by Bristol Yachts in Bristol, Rhode Island, United States. The company produced 149 examples of the type, but it is now out of production.

Design
The Bristol 40 is a recreational keelboat, built predominantly of fiberglass, with wood trim. It has a masthead sloop rig, or an optional cutter or yawl rig, all with aluminum spars. It features a spooned raked stem, a raised counter reverse transom, a keel-mounted rudder controlled by an Edson wheel and a fixed modified long keel, with a cutaway forefoot. A stub keel and centerboard was optional. It displaces  and carries  of lead ballast.

The boat is fitted with a Universal Atomic 4  gasoline engine for docking and maneuvering, although a Westerbeke diesel engine was a factory option.

The design has sleeping accommodation for six people, with a double "V"-berth in the bow cabin, an "U"-shaped settee and dinette table on the port side of the main cabin that converts to a double berth. There is a straight settee, with a pipe berth above it, also in the main cabin. The galley is located on the port side, just forward of the companionway ladder. The galley is equipped with a three-burner alcohol-fired stove, an oven and a sink. A navigation station is opposite the galley, on the starboard side. The head is located just aft of the bow cabin on the port side and includes a shower.

The bow cabin has a double-hinged hatch for ventilation, that can be opened facing forward or aft. There is also a dorade box on the forward deck.

For sailing the boat has two cockpit-mounted primary jib winches, plus two secondary ones, plus a jib halyard winch as standard equipment. Jiffy reefing and a bow-mounted anchor roller were also standard.

The design has a PHRF racing average handicap of 166.

Operational history
In a 1994 review Richard Sherwood wrote, "the Bristol 40 is designed as a racer-cruiser. Many options, including a yawl rig, and several interior layouts are available for the owner who favors cruising. This boat, with its long bow and counter and full keel, is not for round-the-marker sailing, but it will do well on longer races."

Bob Pingel, writing in Sailing Magazine in 2011 noted, "the boat sails quite well in moderate conditions, especially off the wind. The hull shape is designed for reaching and the 40 has won its class in the Marion to Bermuda race twice. Owners report that reefing early is the best way to deal with the initial tenderness and keep the boat on its lines. Upwind, the centerboard helps the boat track, and while it is not particularly close winded, it doesn't make a lot of leeway and the motion is soft." Of the optional yawl rig, he stated, "A yawl was optional and I confess, as impractical as a yawl is, they sure are beautiful. The yawl, like the centerboard, was favored by the CCA rule because sail area aft of the rudder post was not counted in your rating. And there's no better place to mount a radar dome anyway."

See also
List of sailing boat types

Related development
Bristol 39

Similar sailboats
Baltic 40
Bayfield 40
Bermuda 40
Caliber 40
Dickerson 41
Endeavour 40
Islander 40
Lord Nelson 41
Nordic 40

References

Keelboats
1970s sailboat type designs
Sailing yachts
Sailboat type designs by Ted Hood
Sailboat types built by Bristol Yachts